Group G of the 2014–15 EuroChallenge consisted of Port of Antwerp Giants, KTP-Basket, Le Mans Sarthe Basket and Pallacanestro Biella. Play began on 4 November and ended on 16 December 2014.

Teams

Standings

Results

Round 1

Round 2

Round 3

Round 4

Round 5

Round 6

References

Group G
2014–15 in Belgian basketball
2014–15 in French basketball
2014–15 in Italian basketball
2014–15 in Finnish basketball